Claude Turmes (born 26 November 1960) is a Luxembourgish politician who served as a Member of the European Parliament (MEP) from 2009 until 2018. He is a member of the Green Party, part of the European Green Party.

Turmes was elected as a member of the European Parliament in the 1999 European elections. In parliament, he first served on the Committee on Budgetary Control before joining the Committee on Industry, Research and Energy in 2002. In this capacity, he served as rapporteur on the 2008 draft of the EU Renewable Energy Directive 2009/28/EC and on the EU Energy Efficiency Directive 2012. Between 2007 and 2008, he was a member of the Temporary Committee on Climate Change. He also represented the Parliament at the 2008 United Nations Climate Change Conference in Poznań, and the 2016 United Nations Climate Change Conference in Marrakesh.

In 2011, Turmes was part of a cross-party working group headed by Jerzy Buzek, the President of the European Parliament, to draft reforms on lobbying and MEPs’ rules of conduct. In addition to his committee assignments, Turmes was a member of the European Parliament Intergroup on LGBT Rights and of the European Parliament Intergroup on the Welfare and Conservation of Animals.

He became Secretary of State for Sustainable Development and Infrastructures for the Luxembourg government in June 2018, and was appointed Minister for Energy and Minister for Spatial Planning on 5 December 2018.

Other activities
 Energy Watch Group (EWG), Member
 European Forum for Renewable Energy Sources (EUFORES), President
 Agora Energiewende, Member of the Council

References

External links
 Official website 
 

1960 births
Living people
People from Diekirch
The Greens (Luxembourg) MEPs
MEPs for Luxembourg 1999–2004
MEPs for Luxembourg 2004–2009
MEPs for Luxembourg 2009–2014
MEPs for Luxembourg 2014–2019